Blackie is a hamlet in Alberta, Canada within the Foothills County.

History 
The community was named after John Stuart Blackie, a Scottish scholar.  Previously incorporated as a village on December 30, 1912, Blackie dissolved to hamlet status on August 31, 1997.

Demographics 

Notable residents 
Jeremy Colliton - professional ice hockey centre, head coach Chicago Blackhawks
George Groeneveld - Member of the Legislature of Alberta for Highwood, November 22, 2004 -  April 23, 2012
"Boxcar" Pat Egan - former professional ice hockey defenseman

See also 
List of communities in Alberta
List of designated places in Alberta
List of former urban municipalities in Alberta
List of hamlets in Alberta

References

External links
 Community website

Hamlets in Alberta
Foothills County
Designated places in Alberta
Former villages in Alberta
Populated places disestablished in 1997